Labour of Love is the second independent EP by Melbourne acoustic folk band Woodlock.

Described as their 'sophomore' album, Labour of Love was recorded in early 2014 when the band paused their busking career to head to Albert Studios in Sydney to meet with producer Wayne Connolly.

The album was released by digital download through iTunes as well as in physical copies sold at performances, and later from the website. The album gained positive reviews, and charted on the ARIA Charts (a first for the band).

Track listing

Personnel

Adapted from the EP liner notes.

Woodlock
Eze Walters – vocals, acoustic guitar, electric guitar, organ, wurlitzer, production (on Eleanor)
Zech Walters – background vocals, synth, piano, organ, acoustic guitar, electric guitar, bass, production (on Eleanor)
Bowen Purcell – percussion, drums

Additional musicians
Wayne Connolly – production, electric guitar, peppercorn shaker
Jai Ingram – bass guitar
Angus Gomm – trumpet

Charts

Release history

References

2014 EPs
Woodlock albums
Self-released EPs